Edward Atherton Coray (August 24, 1901 – January 2, 1993) was an American football, basketball and baseball coach.  He served as the head football coach at Wheaton College in Wheaton, Illinois for three seasons, from 1926 to 1928, compiling a record of 5–14–3.

Head coaching record

Football

References

1901 births
1993 deaths
American men's basketball players
Wheaton Thunder athletic directors
Wheaton Thunder baseball coaches
Wheaton Thunder football coaches
Wheaton Thunder football players
Wheaton Thunder men's basketball coaches
Wheaton Thunder men's basketball players